Feeding the Wheel is the fifth of many albums by keyboardist Jordan Rudess of Dream Theater and Dixie Dregs fame.  Many other musicians perform on tracks on this album including Terry Bozzio (Frank Zappa, Missing Persons), Steve Morse (Dixie Dregs, Deep Purple), and Dream Theater bandmate John Petrucci, who also worked with Rudess on Liquid Tension Experiment.

Track listing
All pieces are composed by Jordan Rudess.
"The Voice (intro)" – 0:19
"Quantum Soup" – 11:03
"Shifting Sands" – 6:02
"Dreaming in Titanium" – 4:10
"Ucan Icon" – 5:46
"Center of the Sphere" – 1:38
"Crack the Meter" – 6:13
"Headspace" – 4:00
"Revolving Door" – 8:39
"Interstices" – 4:05
"Feed the Wheel" – 10:12

Personnel
Jordan Rudess - All keyboards, electric guitar on track 3
Terry Bozzio - All drums and percussion on tracks 2-7, 9, 11
Steve Morse - Guitar solos on tracks 2, 7
John Petrucci - Guitar on tracks 2, 5, 9, 11
Eugene Friesen - Cello and voice on tracks 2, 4, 8, 9
Billy Sheehan - Bass on track 7
Mark Wood - Electric 7 string Viper on tracks 2, 5, 9, 11
Barry Carl - Voice on track 1
Peter Ernst - Nylon string guitar on track 3
Bert Baldwin - Keyboard strings on track 5, vocal effects

References

External links
 

2001 albums
Jordan Rudess albums